Line 4 of the Dongguan Rail Transit is a planned subway line in Dongguan, China. It has a planned 12 stations and its 'Y' shaped design means that it has 3 terminating stations: Huangjiang Center (interchange with Line 1), Qingxi Coach Terminal and Guanguang (interchange with Shenzhen Metro Line 6). The construction date for Line 3 has not yet been published.

Stations
 From west to east

 Huangjiang Center - Interchange with Line 1
 Huangjiangdong
 Tangxiaxi (Tangxia West)
 Tangxia Center (Interchange with the North > South branch of the same line)
 Dongxing Dadao
 Tangxiadong (Tangxia East)
 Qingxinan (Qingxi South
 Qingxi
 Qingxi Coach Terminal

 From north to south
 Tangxia Center (Interchange with West > East branch of the same line)
 Shaping Lu
 Keyuan Dadao
 Guanguang - Interchange with Shenzhen Metro Line 6

List of planned lines
Line 1
Line 2
Line 3
Line 4

See also
 Guangzhou Metro
 FMetro
 Shenzhen Metro
 List of rapid transit systems
 Metro systems by annual passenger rides

References

External links
 Dongguan Rail Transit – official website 

Dongguan Rail Transit lines
Transport infrastructure under construction in China